Aeronaves Dominicanas or AERODOMCA is an air charter airline established in 1980 with facilities in Samaná El Catey International Airport, and main offices in the La Isabela International Airport, Santo Domingo, Dominican Republic.

The airline serves all the cities of the Dominican Republic and the Caribbean. The services offered are transfer, freight, overflight, helicopter, advertising, air ambulance, and tour services.

Destinations

Destinations served by AERODOMCA (as of September 2009):

 Barahona - Barahona Airport
 Samaná - Samaná Airport
 La Romana - La Romana Airport
 Punta Cana - Punta Cana Airport
 Las Terranas - Portillo Airport
 Santo Domingo - Las Américas Airport
 Santo Domingo - La Isabela Airport
 Santiago - Santiago Airport
 Puerto Plata - Puerto Plata Airport
 Monte Cristi - Monte Cristi Airport

 Cap-Haïtien - Cabo Haitiano Airport

 Santiago de Cuba - Santiago de Cuba Airport

AERODOMCA had the following scheduled flights (as of September 2009):
La Isabela "Higüero" to Portillo (3 daily flights)
Portillo to La Isabela "Higüero" (1 daily flight)
Portillo to Las Américas - La Isabela "Higüero"  (2 daily flights)

Fleet
2 Let L-410 Turbolet
2 GippsAero GA8 Airvan
3 Cessna 172

References

External links

AeroDomca
Air Charter Guide

Airlines of the Dominican Republic
Airlines established in 1980
1980 establishments in the Dominican Republic